Jamal Jafarov (born on 25 February 2002) is an Azerbaijani professional footballer who plays as a forward for Sabah in the Azerbaijan Premier League.

Career

Club
On 17 April 2021, Jafarov made his debut in the Azerbaijan Premier League for Sabah match against Shamakhi.

References

External links
 

2002 births
Living people
Association football forwards
Azerbaijani footballers
Azerbaijan Premier League players
Sabah FC (Azerbaijan) players